Horace Francis Page (October 20, 1833 – August 23, 1890) was an American lawyer and politician who represented California in the United States House of Representatives for five terms between 1873 and 1883. He is perhaps best known for the Page Act of 1875 which began the racial prohibitions against Asian, primarily Chinese, immigration. Page was among a faction of congressmen who openly used racist ideas to defend their positions. Page introduced the Chinese Exclusion Act to the House. When arguing for a ban on the immigration of Chinese laborers, he sought to win support from those who believed in white racial superiority, telling his fellow members that "there is not a member upon this floor... who believes that the coming of the African race... was a blessing to us or to the African himself."

Biography
Page was born near Medina, Orleans County, New York. He attended public schools and Millville Academy and then taught school in La Porte County, Indiana until 1854. Then, he moved to California and engaged in the sawmill business near Colfax. He moved to Placerville and engaged in the livery-stable business. He became engaged in mining, as a mail contractor, and as a stage proprietor.

Horace Page studied law, was admitted to the bar, and commenced practice in California. He was an unsuccessful Republican candidate for state senate in 1869. He served as a major in the California Militia. He was elected as a Republican to the 43rd United States Congress and the four succeeding Congresses. He served from March 4, 1873, to March 3, 1883. During the 47th United States Congress, he was the chairman of the Committee on Commerce. In 1882, he was an unsuccessful candidate for re-election to the 48th United States Congress.

In 1884, Horace Page was a delegate to the Republican National Convention. He resumed the practice of law in Washington, D.C. He died in San Francisco, California and was interred in Mountain View Cemetery, Oakland, California.

References

External links 
 

1833 births
1890 deaths
Anti-Chinese sentiment in the United States
Republican Party members of the United States House of Representatives from California
19th-century American politicians
19th-century far-right politicians in the United States
People from Medina, New York
American white supremacists
People from LaPorte County, Indiana
People from Placerville, California